The Lady Anusuiya Singhania Education Centre is a school in Jhalawar, in the Indian state of Rajasthan, under the aegis of JK White Cement Works, Gotan. The campus is located between Jhalawar and Jhalrapatan. The school has three streams for classes XI and XII, commerce,humanities and science.

History

The school was founded in 1984 and later sold to Mustaq Babu in 1998. It reopened in 2007. The school first principal was DR.A.Ramaswamy. School just have classes up to 5th in very first year but it was upgraded to class 8th in 2008, to 9th in 2009, to 10th in 2010 and the school received Senior secondary standard in 2011. The school lost his mentor, his first principal on 21 December 2012 Dr. A.Ramaswamy. Mrs. A.Jeeva is the principal from then.

Results

The school's first result of class 10 was amazing three student stood in 10 CGPA category for very first time in district. In the batch of 10th of 2012-13 13 student were 10 CGPAian. The school produces its first 12th batch in the same year, the highest percentage in commerce stream was 88% and in science 82.8%. There were 3 10 CGPA in batch of 2013-14 in class 10th.

The Campus

The campus has two wings: one for classes Nursery to III and other for senior classes IV to XII. The Campus has two wings, one common football and cricket field, two basketball courts, one tennis court, one volleyball court, one skating rink, a handball court, biggest Biology, Physics, Chemistry Lab in Jhalawar.

External sources

Schools in Rajasthan
Education in Jhalawar district